Yevgeny Sergeyevich Botkin (27 March 1865 – 17 July 1918), commonly known as Eugene Botkin, was the court physician since 1908 for Tsar Nicholas II and Tsarina Alexandra. He sometimes treated the Tsarevich Alexei Nikolaevich of Russia for haemophilia-related complications, like in Spala in 1912.

Following the Russian Revolution of 1917, Botkin went into exile with the Romanov family, accompanying them to Tobolsk and Yekaterinburg in Siberia. He was murdered with the Imperial family by guards on 17 July 1918. 

Like the Romanov family, Botkin was canonised in 1981 as a New Martyr by the Russian Orthodox Church Outside of Russia. 

In 2000, the Russian Orthodox Church canonised the Romanov family as passion bearers. On 3 February 2016, the Bishop's Council of the Russian Orthodox Church canonised Botkin as Righteous Passion-Bearer Yevgeny the Physician.

Early life and career
Botkin was born in the Saint Petersburg in the Russian Empire, the fourth son of Anastasia Alexandrovna (Krylova) and Sergey Botkin, who had been a court physician ("Leib Medik") since 1870 under Tsars Alexander II and Alexander III. His father is considered one of the founders of modern Russian medical science and education who introduced triage, pathological anatomy, and post mortem diagnostics into Russian medical practice. 

Initially home educated he entered the 5th grade of The Second Saint Petersburg Gymnasium. Botkin followed his father in studying medicine, getting his degree at the S. M. Kirov Military Medical Academy on the properties of blood and doing additional studies at the universities of Berlin and Heidelberg (1890-1892, 1895).  He served with distinction aboard the St. Georgievsky Red Cross hospital train and wrote notes on the Russo-Japanese War. In 1907 he was appointed as chief physician at Saint George City Hospital in St. Petersburg. 

Botkin married Olga Vladimirovna Manuilova in 1891 and had four children, Dimitri, Yuri, Gleb and Tatiana. His marriage broke up under the strain caused by Botkin's dedication to the Romanovs and his long hours at court. His wife, Olga, started an affair with Friedrich (Fritz) Lichinger, a pharmacist and was granted a divorce.

His oldest son, Dimitri was killed in action during the First World War. Botkin became increasingly religious and "developed an increasing abhorrence for the flesh," according to his son Gleb. His daughter Tatiana wrote his memoirs.

"From a very tender age, his beautiful and noble nature was complete," his brother Peter recalled later. "He was never like other children. Always sensitive, of a delicate, inner sweetness of extraordinary soul, he had a horror of any kind of struggle or fight. We other boys would fight with fury. He would not take part in our combats, but when our pugilism took on a dangerous character he would stop the combatants at risk of injuring himself. He was very studious and conscientious in his studies. For a profession he chose medicine: to help, to succour, to soothe, to heal without end."

Exile and death
Botkin felt it was his duty to accompany the Romanovs into exile, not only because of his responsibility to his patients, the Romanov family but also to his country. Botkin was considered a friend by Tsar Nicholas II. The doctor also often spoke with Tsarina Alexandra in her native German and acted as a translator for her when she received a Russian delegation.

After Botkin and the family were executed, White Army investigators found this unfinished letter by him. It was written in his quarters on the night of 16 July 1918: 

The letter was interrupted when Yakov Yurovsky, the head of the command at the Ipatiev House knocked on Botkin's door.  He ordered the entire Romanov party to dress and come downstairs, on the premise that there was gunfire in the town, and they were to be evacuated.  But the entire family and their servants (including Botkin who volunteered) were murdered a short time later.

In the early 1990s, after the unmarked gravesite had been discovered and Botkin's remains were examined, he was found to have had bullet wounds on his legs, pelvis, vertebrae, and forehead.

Honours and awards
 Order of St. Vladimir, 3rd and 2nd classes with swords,
 Order of St. Anna, 2nd class
 Order of St. Stanislaus, 3rd class
 Order of St. Sava, 2nd class
Bulgarian "For Citizenship Award"
1981, canonised by Russian Church Outside of Russia as New Martyr.
2016, canonised by the Russian Orthodox Church as passion bearer.

Representation in other media 
Botkin features as a character in David Logan's (an Australian playwright) Ekaterinburg. It explores the time in captivity of the Romanovs and their retainers in the Ipatiev House in Ekaterinburg.

Botkin was featured in the 1971 film Nicholas and Alexandra, portrayed by Timothy West; as  well as the 1996 television movie Rasputin: Dark Servant of Destiny where he was portrayed by David Warner.

See also
Romanov sainthood

References

Wegner, Armin T. (1930). Fünf Finger über dir. Deutsche Verlags-Anstalt, Stuttgart. Berlin und Leipzig.

Notes

1865 births
1918 deaths
People from Pushkin, Saint Petersburg
People from Tsarskoselsky Uyezd
Canonised servants of the Romanov household
People murdered in Russia
Victims of Red Terror in Soviet Russia
Physicians from the Russian Empire
 Court physicians
20th-century Christian saints
Russian saints of the Eastern Orthodox Church
Recipients of the Order of St. Vladimir, 2nd class
Recipients of the Order of St. Anna, 2nd class
Great Officers of the Order of St. Sava
Executed people from Saint Petersburg
Executed Russian people
People executed by Russia by firing squad
Court of Nicholas II of Russia
S.M. Kirov Military Medical Academy alumni